Panihati Assembly constituency is an assembly constituency in North 24 Parganas district in the Indian state of West Bengal.

Overview
As per orders of the Delimitation Commission, No. 111 Panihati Assembly constituency is composed of the following: Ward Nos.1 to 14, 16, 17 and 22 to 34 of Panihati municipality.

Panihati Assembly constituency is part of No. 16 Dum Dum (Lok Sabha constituency).

Members of Legislative Assembly

Election results

2021

2011
In the 2011 election, Nirmal Ghosh of Trinamool Congress defeated his nearest rival Ahibhusan Chakraborty  of CPI(M).

.# Swing calculated on Congress+Trinamool Congress vote percentages taken together in 2006.

1977–2006
In the 2006 state assembly elections, Gopal Krishna Bhattacharya of CPI(M) won the Panihati assembly seat, defeating his nearest rival Nirmal Ghosh of Trinamool Congress. Contests in most years were multi cornered but only winners and runners are being mentioned. Nirmal Ghosh representing Trinamool Congress in 2001 defeated Kamal Sengupta Basu of CPI(M), and representing Congress in 1996 defeated Tania Chakraborty of CPI(M). Tania Chakraborty of CPI(M) defeated Nirmal Ghosh of Congress in 1991. Gopal Krishna Bhattacharya of CPI(M) defeated Tapan Chattopadhyay of Congress in 1987 and 1982, and Sanmatha Nath Ghosh of Janata Party in 1977.

1967–1972
Tapan Chatterjee of Congress won in 1972. Gopal Krishna Bhattacharjee of CPI(M) won in 1971, 1969 and 1967. Prior to that the Panihati seat was not there.

References

Assembly constituencies of West Bengal
Politics of North 24 Parganas district